Rupert I may refer to:

 Rupert I, Count of Laurenburg (died 1154)
 Rupert I, Elector Palatine (1309–1390)
 Rupert I of Legnica (1347–by 1409)